Donald Kagan (May 1, 1932August 6, 2021) was a Lithuanian-born American historian and classicist at Yale University specializing in ancient Greece. He formerly taught in the Department of History at Cornell University. Kagan was considered among the foremost American scholars of Greek history and is notable for his four-volume history of the Peloponnesian War.

Early life and education
Kagan was born in Kuršėnai, Lithuania, on May 1, 1932.  His father, Shmuel, died before Kagan turned two years old, and his mother, Leah (Benjamin), subsequently emigrated to the United States with Kagan and his sister.  He grew up in the Brownsville section of Brooklyn.  He attended Thomas Jefferson High School, where he played football, before becoming the first person in his family to go to college.  He graduated from Brooklyn College in 1954, received a master's degree in classics from Brown University in 1955, and a Doctor of Philosophy in history from the Ohio State University in 1958.

Academic career

Once a liberal Democrat, Kagan changed his views around 1969. According to Jim Lobe, cited by Craig Unger, Kagan's turn away from liberalism occurred in 1969 when Cornell University was pressured into starting a Black Studies program by gun-wielding students who had seized the Willard Straight Hall. Kagan reflected, "watching administrators demonstrate all the courage of Neville Chamberlain had a great impact on me, and I became much more conservative." Afterwards, Kagan was one of the original signers of the 1997 Statement of Principles by the neoconservative think tank Project for the New American Century, co-founded by his son Robert. On the eve of the 2000 presidential elections, Kagan and his other son, Frederick, published While America Sleeps, a call to increase defense spending.

Known for his prolific research on the Peloponnesian War; Kagan is also famous for his work On the Origins of War and the Preservation of Peace, a comparative history examining four major conflicts (the Peloponnesian War, World War I, the Second Punic War, and World War II) and one non-conflict (the Cuban Missile Crisis) with the purpose of identifying how and why wars do or do not begin. Remarking in 2015 on the work, Kagan summarized the causes of war by quoting Thucydides: "You know, Thucydides has this great insight. I wish I could get people to pay attention – he has one of his speakers at the beginning of the war say, 'Why do people go to war? Out of fear, honor, and interest.' Well, everybody knows interest, and fear is very credible. Nobody takes honor seriously." Kagan believes honor – better understood as "prestige" – was crucial in beginning World War I, for example.

The National Endowment for the Humanities (NEH) awarded Kagan the National Humanities Medal in 2002, and selected him to deliver the 2005 Jefferson Lecture. Kagan titled his lecture "In Defense of History"; he argued that history is of primary importance in the study of the humanities. In his The New Yorker review, George Steiner said of Kagan's four-volume history of the Peloponnesian War: "The temptation to acclaim Kagan's four volumes as the foremost work of history produced in North America in this century is vivid."

Until his retirement in 2013, Kagan was Sterling Professor of Classics and History at Yale University. His "The Origins of War" was one of Yale's most popular courses for twenty-five years, and was the basis of a book he published in 1995. Over an even longer timespan he taught "Introduction to Ancient Greek History", and upper level History and Classical Civilization seminars focusing on topics from Thucydides to the Lacedaimonian hegemony.

Personal life and family
Kagan married Myrna Dabrusky in 1954.  They met while studying at Thomas Jefferson High School together, and remained married for 62 years until her death in 2017.  Together, they had two children: Robert and Frederick.

Kagan died on August 6, 2021, at a retirement home in Washington, D.C.  He was 89 years old.

Positions held

 1987–1988 Acting Director of Athletics, Yale University
 1989–1992 Dean, Yale College

Works
 Kagan, Donald. (1965). The Great Dialogue: A History of Greek Political Thought from Homer to Polybius. New York: Free Press. 
 Kagan, Donald. (1969). The Outbreak of the Peloponnesian War. Ithaca: Cornell University Press. .
 Kagan, Donald. (1974). The Archidamian War. Ithaca: Cornell University Press. .
 Kagan, Donald. (1981). The Peace of Nicias and the Sicilian Expedition. Ithaca: Cornell University Press. .
 Kagan, Donald. (1987). The Fall of the Athenian Empire. Ithaca: Cornell University Press. 
 Kagan, Donald. (1991). Pericles of Athens and the Birth of Democracy. New York: The Free Press. .
 Kagan, Donald. (1995). On the Origins of War and the Preservation of Peace. New York: Doubleday. .
 Kagan, Donald and Kagan, Frederick. (2000). While America Sleeps. New York: St. Martin's Press. .
 Kagan, Donald, Craig, Albert M., Graham, William A., Ozment, Steven, and Turner, Frank M. (2000). The Heritage of World Civilizations. 
 Kagan, Donald, Ozment, Steven, and Turner, Frank M. (2003). The Western Heritage. New York: Prentice Hall. .
 Kagan, Donald. (2003). The Peloponnesian War. New York: Viking Press. .
 Kagan, Donald. (2009). Thucydides: The Reinvention of History. New York: Viking Press. .
 Kagan, Donald. (2013). Men of Bronze: Hoplite Warfare in Ancient Greece. Princeton University Press.

References

External links

 Kagan Classics faculty page at Yale
 Introduction to Ancient Greek History—video course with Prof. Donald Kagan from Open Yale Courses (click the "Sessions" tab to access the videos; archive)
 
 NEH biography
 

1932 births
2021 deaths
20th-century American historians
20th-century American male writers
21st-century American historians
21st-century American male writers
American classical scholars
American male non-fiction writers
American military historians
American people of Lithuanian-Jewish descent
Brooklyn College alumni
Brown University alumni
Classical scholars of Yale University
Connecticut Republicans
Cornell University Department of History faculty
Historians from Connecticut
Historians from New York (state)
Hudson Institute
Jewish American historians
Lithuanian emigrants to the United States
National Humanities Medal recipients
Ohio State University alumni
People from Brownsville, Brooklyn
People from Kuršėnai
People from North Haven, Connecticut
Scholars of ancient Greek history
Writers from New Haven, Connecticut
Yale Sterling Professors
21st-century American Jews